Victor Carl Grigg (March 25, 1921 – October 30, 1985) was a Canadian professional hockey player who played for the Pittsburgh Hornets, Providence Reds, Springfield Indians and St. Louis Flyers in the American Hockey League.

External links
 
Reference to the "late Victor Carl Grigg"

1921 births
1985 deaths
Canadian ice hockey defencemen
Canadian expatriates in the United States